The following species in the flowering plant genus Amaranthus, the amaranths, are accepted by Plants of the World Online. A number of these species are neglected and underutilized crops.

Amaranthus acanthobracteatus 
Amaranthus acanthochiton 
Amaranthus acutilobus 
Amaranthus × adulterinus 
Amaranthus albus 
Amaranthus anderssonii 
Amaranthus arenicola 
Amaranthus asplundii 
Amaranthus atropurpureus 
Amaranthus aureus 
Amaranthus australis 
Amaranthus bahiensis 
Amaranthus bengalense 
Amaranthus blitoides 
Amaranthus blitum 
Amaranthus brandegeei 
Amaranthus brownii 
Amaranthus × budensis 
Amaranthus × cacciatoi 
Amaranthus californicus 
Amaranthus cannabinus 
Amaranthus capensis 
Amaranthus cardenasianus 
Amaranthus × caturus 
Amaranthus caudatus 
Amaranthus celosioides 
Amaranthus centralis 
Amaranthus clementii 
Amaranthus cochleitepalus 
Amaranthus commutatus 
Amaranthus congestus 
Amaranthus crassipes 
Amaranthus crispus 
Amaranthus cruentus 
Amaranthus cuspidifolius 
Amaranthus deflexus 
Amaranthus dinteri 
Amaranthus fimbriatus 
Amaranthus floridanus 
Amaranthus furcatus 
Amaranthus graecizans 
Amaranthus grandiflorus 
Amaranthus greggii 
Amaranthus hunzikeri 
Amaranthus hybridus 
Amaranthus hypochondriacus 
Amaranthus induratus 
Amaranthus interruptus 
Amaranthus × jansen-wachterianus 
Amaranthus kloosianus 
Amaranthus lepturus 
Amaranthus lombardoi 
Amaranthus looseri 
Amaranthus macrocarpus 
Amaranthus minimus 
Amaranthus mitchellii 
Amaranthus muricatus 
Amaranthus neei 
Amaranthus obcordatus 
Amaranthus palmeri 
Amaranthus paraganensis 
Amaranthus pedersenianus 
Amaranthus persimilis 
Amaranthus peruvianus 
Amaranthus polygonoides 
Amaranthus powellii 
Amaranthus praetermissus 
Amaranthus pumilus 
Amaranthus × pyxidatus 
Amaranthus rajasekharii 
Amaranthus × ralletii 
Amaranthus retroflexus 
Amaranthus rhombeus 
Amaranthus rosengurttii 
Amaranthus saradhiana 
Amaranthus scariosus 
Amaranthus schinzianus 
Amaranthus scleranthoides 
Amaranthus scleropoides 
Amaranthus sonoriensis 
Amaranthus × soproniensis 
Amaranthus sparganicephalus 
Amaranthus spinosus 
Amaranthus squamulatus 
Amaranthus standleyanus 
Amaranthus × tamariscinus 
Amaranthus tamaulipensis 
Amaranthus × texensis 
Amaranthus thunbergii 
Amaranthus torreyi 
Amaranthus tortuosus 
Amaranthus tricolor 
Amaranthus tuberculatus 
Amaranthus tucsonensis 
Amaranthus tunetanus 
Amaranthus undulatus 
Amaranthus urceolatus 
Amaranthus viridis 
Amaranthus viscidulus 
Amaranthus vulgatissimus 
Amaranthus watsonii 
Amaranthus wrightii

References

Amaranthus